"Treat Me Nice" is a song recorded by Elvis Presley. The song was included in the musical revue Smokey Joe's Cafe. The song was featured prominently in the film Jailhouse Rock.

Chart performance

Personnel
Elvis Presley – lead vocal
Scotty Moore – electric guitar
Bill Black – double bass
D.J. Fontana – drums
Mike Stoller – piano
The Jordanaires – backing vocals
Steve Sholes – producer
Thorne Nogar – Engineer

References

1958 singles
Elvis Presley songs
Songs written by Jerry Leiber and Mike Stoller
1958 songs
RCA Victor singles